Nagjhiri is a village near Ujjain, India. It is located in the state of Madhya Pradesh and the district Ujjain.

See also 

 Ujjain

References

External links 

 Official Website

Villages of Ujjain district